János Bencze (1952 – 13 April 1996) was a Hungarian footballer, goalkeeper.

Career 
He played at Diósgyőri VTK between 1970 and 1971. His first match at the Division I was against Újpesti Dózsa on 26 April 1970. From 1971 to 1977 he played at Szegedi EOL of Szeged. He was a goalkeeper on 27 matches.

Sources 
 János Bencze at Hungarian Football Database

1952 births
1996 deaths
Hungarian footballers
Association football goalkeepers
Diósgyőri VTK players